VCU Rams basketball may refer to either of the basketball teams that represent Virginia Commonwealth University:
VCU Rams men's basketball
VCU Rams women's basketball